Ariane Astrid Atodji (Arabic: أريان أستريد أتودجي; born 1980), is an Cameroonian filmmaker as well as a screenwriter. She has made several critically acclaimed documentaries including Koundi et le Jeudi national and La souffrance est une école de sagesse.

Personal life
She was born in 1980 in Nguelemendouka, Cameroon. She graduated from University of Yaoundé and then attended to film workshops at the Goethe Institute in Yaoundé. Then she moved to the LN International Film School of Yaoundé for further studies.

Career
In 2010, she directed her maiden documentary Koundi et le Jeudi national which was produced with the support of the Goethe Institute. She won the special jury prize at the Dubai Film Festival (DIFF) for the film. In 2014, she directed the second documentary La souffrance est une école de sagesse.

Filmography

References

External links
 

Living people
Cameroonian women film directors
1980 births
People from East Region (Cameroon)